Clube Esportivo Naviraiense, also known as Naviraiense, are a Brazilian football team from Naviraí, Mato Grosso do Sul. They competed in the Série D in 2009.

History
Clube Esportivo Naviraiense were founded on 25 November 2005. They won the Campeonato Sul-Matogrossense Série B in 2007, and the Campeonato Sul-Matogrossense in 2009, when they beat Ivinhema in the final. Naviraiense competed in the Série D in 2009 when they were eliminated in the first stage of the competition.

In 2010, they played in the Brazil Cup. They faced Santos in the first phase. In the first game, at home, they lost by 1-0, forcing a second game in Vila Belmiro. However, back in the game, Santos won the game by 10-0, with 6-0 in the first half.

Stadium
Naviraiense play their home games at Virotão. The stadium has a maximum capacity of 3,500 people.

Achievements

 Campeonato Sul-Mato-Grossense:
 Winners (1): 2009
 Campeonato Sul-Mato-Grossense Série B:
 Winners (2): 2007, 2021

References

Association football clubs established in 2005
Football clubs in Mato Grosso do Sul
2005 establishments in Brazil